Lu Zhongyi (18 May 1849 – 26 February 1925) was the seventeenth patriarch of Yiguan Dao (I-Kuan Tao). His religious titles were Tung Li Zu and Jin Gong Zu Shi (金公祖師; Golden Elder). Lu is, according to Yiguan Dao doctrine, the incarnation of Maitreya.

He was born on the 24th day of 4th Lunar month in 1849, in Jining, Shandong province, China. He was said to be illiterate, his father died when he was young, left with his mother and sister Lu ZhongJie. He joined the army at age 22 and became an officer in the Manzhou DongBei (Manchuria) government. In 1895, at the age of 46 he was said to have a dream from God instructing him to become the student of the 16th patriarch Liu Qingxu (Wang Jueyi's successor).

He became the 17th patriarch of Yiguan Dao in 1905 in Qingzhou. Yiguan Dao followers believe that he is the first leader of the "White Sun" Era, the last era of the Three Stages Final Kalpa, thus he is the incarnation of savior Maitreya or Hotei. In 1918, Lu brought I-Kuan Tao to his hometown Jining, within a few years, Lu managed to attract some 25 disciples, among them Zhang Tianran and Sun Suzhen.

Lu died on the 2nd day of the 2nd lunar month in 1925. Thus, Lu's younger sister Lu Zhong Jie (also known as Lao Gu Nai Nai, Mistress of the Old Cave) who was believed to be the incarnation of bodhisattva Guan Yin, took over the leadership for six years.

Zhang Tianran and Sun Suzhen became the successor through spirit writing by the Heavenly Mother. However, the other seven major disciples of Lu once refused his succession. In 1930 Zhang officially was bestowed the leadership as the 18th patriarch of Yiguan Dao in Jinan.

See also 
 Zhang Tianran
 I Kuan Tao
 Budai
 List of Buddha claimants

References 
Thomas DuBois. 2005. The Sacred Village: Social Change and Religious Life in Rural North China. University of Hawai'i Press.  
 David Jordan & Daniel Overmyer. 1985. The Flying Phoenix: Aspects of Chinese Sectarianism in Taiwan. Princeton University Press.
 Soo Khin Wah. 1997. A Study of the Yiguan Dao (Unity Sect) and its Development in Peninsular Malaysia. Ph.D. dissertation, University of British Columbia.

External links 
Patriarchs of I Kuan Tao
History of Lu Zhong Yi according to I Kuan Tao
Founding father of I Kuan Tao

1849 births
1925 deaths
I-Kuan Tao Patriarchs
People from Jining